The army of the German state of Württemberg was the army of Kingdom of Württemberg until 1918.

Its troops were maintained by Württemberg for its national defence and as a unit of the Swabian Circle (district) of Holy Roman Empire, the Confederation of the Rhine, the German Confederation and finally of the Imperial German Army. In addition, particularly in the 18th century, there were also regiments that were lent to other dukes and foreign powers.  This practice was often criticized as "soldier trading" or "Soldatenhandel"; a form of mercenary service.

When the Imperial German Army was established around the Prussian Army in 1871, the incorporated Württemberg Army remained an independent contingent (like the Bavarian Army and the Saxon Army). It was formed into the XIII (Royal Württemberg) Corps until 1918, mainly comprising the 26th and 27th infantry divisions and the 26th dragoon regiment.

See also
History of Württemberg
Kingdom of Württemberg

References

Military history of Württemberg
Württemberg
Disbanded armies